Imperial feminism, also known as imperialist feminism, colonial feminism or intersectional imperialism refers to instances where, critics argue, feminist rhetoric is used to justify empire-building or imperialism. The term has come into greater usage in the twentieth and twenty-first centuries, with one scholar declaring it as something which "privileges inequality through gender bending that masquerades as gendered equality... Imperial feminism privileges empire building through war." The related term intersectional imperialism has applied to the foreign policy of Western nations which are perceived as engaging in, or supporting, imperialistic policies while at the same time promoting inclusive and progressive rhetoric at home. 

In academia and the discourse surrounding women's studies, imperial feminism and its related terms are generally used to critique Western feminism's attitudes towards non-white and non-Western countries, alleging that they perpetuate inaccurate and demeaning stereotypes about the status of women in third world countries. In particular, Western feminism has been critiqued for supposedly creating an image of non-white and non-Western women in a lower socioeconomic position in the countries they live in than reality. In addition, Western feminism has been critiqued used the "imperial feminism" sobriquet for instances of racist viewpoints being displayed towards marginalized minority ethnic groups who are not part of mainstream feminism. Some scholars have claimed that postcolonial feminism has developed partly in response to the attitudes being displayed by their Western counterparts.

Early History 
 

The term "imperial feminism" has its roots in the expansion of European colonial empires in the eighteenth and nineteenth centuries. As Europeans came to rule over large populations of non-white and non-Western people, among the several arguments they used in favor of the so-called "civilizing mission" was that women in these nations were oppressed by the male population thanks to old-fashioned sexist ideologies. Colonial rule, they claimed, would benefit these women by liberating them from the shackles of their male counterparts. 

Palestinian-American historian Edward Said characterizes this phenomenon as part of "Orientalism" and claims European scholarship, culture, and society have perpetuated stereotypes about non-Western civilizations' culture, practices, and society as morally depraved and backwards in order to establish control over them. Among these practices, the subjugation of women was heavily criticized and used by colonial powers as a justification for their continued rule. Cultural practices such as sati, child marriage, and pardah were all cultural aspects which European powers pointed to as supposed "backwardness" of Oriental nations. In Southwest Asia and North Africa, colonial powers fixated on the Islamic veil as a symbol of oppression. Evelyn Baring, a colonial administrator in Egypt, was known for his campaigns against the veil, which he claimed had an oppressive effect on Egyptian women. In the colonial Philippines, Westerners were horrified by the social acceptance of women's exposed breasts in public, perceiving this as an obscenity that they needed to be 'saved' from. Europeans viewed these practices as backwards and demonstrative of a need for European rule, providing colonial powers with an ideological justification for colonial rule.

Recent usage 

After the September 11 terrorist attacks, the United States and its allies launched an invasion of Afghanistan. Among the rhetoric used to justify the war in the United States, some was focused on the plight of women in Afghanistan under the Taliban as a reason for launching the invasion. First Lady Laura Bush, for instance, made several radio speeches claiming that the American invasion would help the Afghan women be freed from the oppression of the Taliban. In one of her speeches, she stated that, "Civilized people throughout the world are speaking out in horror -- not only because our hearts break for the women and children in Afghanistan, but also because in Afghanistan, we see the world the terrorists would like to impose on the rest of us." Bush made similar arguments throughout her husband's time in office, prompting Mother Jones to write in 2007 that Laura Bush had taken the lead in pushing "a tidy moral justification for [the U.S.] invasion of Afghanistan."

A few months after the invasion, Bush celebrated the U.S.'s apparent progress towards emancipating the women of Afghanistan:

"Because of our recent military gains, in much of Afghanistan women are no longer imprisoned in their homes. They can listen to music and teach their daughters without fear of punishment. Yet, the terrorists who helped rule that country now plot and plan in many countries, and they must be stopped. The fight against terrorism is also a fight for the rights and dignity of women."

These arguments have been criticized by some, including American writer Akbar Shahid Ahmed, who writes that while appearing to be beneficial on the surface, Bush's rhetoric is harmful toward's America's goals in Afghanistan, with the Taliban choosing to "present empowering women... as code for entrenching American control." In addition, she has raised the question of whether or not "critical efforts to help women secure the status of full citizens... really need to be tied to U.S. militarism."

See also 

 Asian women
 Convention on the Elimination of All Forms of Discrimination Against Women
 Cultural imperialism
 Equal opportunity
 Femen
 Gender equality
 Gender inequality
 History of feminism
 Human rights
 international feminism
 Intersectional feminism
 Islamic feminism
 Mahnaz Afkhami
 Orientalism
 Pinkwashing
 Postcolonial feminism
 Power (social and political)
 Purplewashing
 Racial equality
 Radical feminism
 Transnational feminism
 Women in Islam
 Women's rights
 Women for Women International

References 

Feminism and society
Eurocentrism